Gary Green may refer to:
Gary Green (American football) (born 1955), former American football cornerback
Gary Green (baseball) (born 1962), American former Major League Baseball shortstop
Gary Green (baseball owner) (born 1965), minor league baseball franchise owner
Gary Green (conductor), American conductor
Gary Green (ice hockey) (born 1953), former NHL hockey coach and broadcaster
Gary Green (musician) (born 1950), British musician
Gary M. Green, musician, author, gaming consultant and entrepreneur
Gary Green (Arrowverse), a fictional character in the Arrowverse franchise

See also
Garry Green, Canadian politician